Ericodesma spodophanes is a species of moth of the family Tortricidae. It is found in Australia, where it has been recorded from Victoria.

Description 
The wingspan is about 15.5 mm.

References

External links 

Moths described in 1945
Archipini